Diorama Arts Cooperative (DAC)  was a mixture of actors, artists, dancers, designers, journalists, musicians and therapists that used The Diorama, Regent's Park between the years 1976 and 1992. In September 1981, DAC was incorporated as the charity Diorama Arts Centre Ltd.

From the Theatres Trust: "In the 1970s, the arts collective created a small theatre within a lively arts centre, widely known as a place for arts, craft, theatre, concerts and more." From the book The Diorama Arts Project: "Diorama arts is a community arts group particularly concerned with the handicapped and under-privileged, which plans to convert the Regents Park Diorama building for use as its headquarters."

Christmas 1992 saw Diorama Arts Centre Ltd. leaving the building as landlord the  Crown Estate Commissioners  and Camden Council relocated the organisation to a new development close by in Osnaburgh Street. The Old Diorama Arts Centre, now based at Regent's Place campus, continues the charity at the present time.

Timeline

Designed by John Arrowsmith and built by Morgan & Pugin, the Diorama showed paintings by Daguerre and Bouton. The building was made of brick and was polygonal in shape and the frontage is visible in a large row of Regency era buildings, designed by John Nash. The popular but short-lived form of visual entertainment provided painted scenes dramatised with lighting and other effects. Artist John Constable, who was present at the first showing in September 1823, is quoted as saying: "It is in part a transparency, the spectator is in a dark chamber, and it is very pleasing and has great illusion." Daguerre's diorama closed in 1848 due to falling sales and by 1854 had been converted into a Baptists chapel. The chapel closed in 1922 and was then taken over by the Red Cross, who joined with the Middlesex Hospital. In the 1920s, Thomas Pole designed the Octagon in the Diorama and a rheumatism treatment pool for hydrotherapy was installed, with the Hospital leaving the building by 1964. Then in 1965 Bedford College moved in their Geography, Zoology and Social Research Departments eventually leaving . The Octagon's internal shape was that used by the DAC and a resident cafe was later named after it.

Years 1976 to 1981
 
By c.1976, a Cooperative arts group had taken over the Diorama. From the New Statesman: "The Crown granted annual leases to some dyslexia therapists who used music and drama; gradually the building filled with artists and therapy groups who paid small rents (to cover the cost of the upkeep) to the collective which became Diorama Arts." The poet and drama therapist Larry Butler recalls his involvement: "Before coming to Glasgow in 1981, I was the founder and warden of the Diorama Arts Co-operative, director of PlaySpace Trust and Matchbox Theatre."

Hazel Carey, former member of Matchbox Theatre, writes in her book Ubuntu: my life in other people: "Around the end of the 1970s and into the '80s, people who were culturally and creatively progressive were springing up with ideas and propositions that were helping to produce an alternative lifestyle. Larry Butler was one of those people." Further: "We had our base in the Diorama, the first cinematic house in London, in Regent's Park, where Larry worked as the caretaker. He was a good carer, and a pioneer in the field of communication, where his leadership was streaked with the marks of a wild genius."

From the website My Camden: "In the late seventies artists and performers took up residence in the Diorama building by Regent's Park, developing a co-operative approach to the arts, education, therapy, and disability arts."

As the Diorama was/is  Crown Estate property, no formal advertising of plays, concerts or so forth was allowed. Events could happen but only if advertised by word-of-mouth.

Years 1981 to 1992

After a  Crown Estate Commissioners (CEC) request, Diorama Arts Centre Ltd. was incorporated as a charity and company on the 15th September 1981, and in 1982 a rent agreement was formalised. Until then, it had had a Peppercorn rent of approximately £25 per year.

However, in 1983 the group was faced with eviction attempts as Greycoats Estates, acting for the CEC, sought to redevelop the Diorama into offices. DACL fought the attempted eviction and in 1984 won the case after a public inquiry by the Department of the Environment.

Helped by URBED's Re-use of Industrial Buildings Service (RIBS) by February 1984, the Diorama Arts Trust had been formed to put forward a scheme that resulted in a £4m fundraising effort through 1984 and beyond.

In June/July 1984 CAST (Cartoon Archetypical Slogan Theatre), led by Roland Muldoon, agreed to become full members of Diorama Arts Ltd.

In August 1984, an appeal by the CEC was started to reverse Camden Councils' (CC) failure to give permission for the renovation of The Diorama.

In August 1986, a report by the Director of Planning & Communications for CC refused a planning application submitted by Hunter & Partners on behalf of the CEC.

The National Archives have a catalogue 'The Diorama, Regent's Park' for the years 1 December 1985 - 31 Dec 1988.

The website Library of Book has a reference to Diorama Arts Trust Correspondence May 1986 To October 1990. The entry states: "Correspondence from the Diorama Arts Trust (of which Denys Lasdun was a patron) over the future of the historic Diorama building in Regents Park."

On 25 January 1990 a press conference was held by the Diorama Arts Trust which included a press release, a list of the Trusts' members and some reactions to the Trust's plans to preserve The Diorama.

From The Old Diorama Arts Centre: "...Diorama Arts Centre Ltd., combines a wide range of artistic activities organised in such a way as to provide a self-funding public building dedicated to the arts. Only after several years of campaigning through the courts and in the community have we been able to rescue the building from neglect, obscurity and demolition."

Christmas 1992 saw Diorama Arts Centre Ltd. leaving the building as the CEC and CC relocated the organisation to a new development close by in Osnaburgh Street.

Music

"The lovely Diorama is really part of the drama, I'd say". Lyrics by Elvis Costello from the song London's Brilliant Parade.

Percussionist Jon Keliehor from Matchbox Theatre started a music studio c.1976 which continued until 1984, later called The Diorama Percussion Music Research Unit. During his time at the Diorama, Keliehor continued experimenting with writing music for dance, drama and theatre, and through his involvement with London Contemporary Dance Theatre, support was forthcoming for the initial years from Robin Howard, one of its founders and CEO. The Many Ways of Moving conference took place in 1977 and resulted in the Diorama becoming one of the centres for the alternate dance movement network.

Between 1976 and 1992, many musicians played at the Diorama. These included:

Nick Cave and the Bad Seeds played on the 30th October 1984. This was Cave's third reading. Other performers included Lydia Lunch and Jessamy Calkin.

Two Big Boys recorded a concert there in 1984 and released it as "Live At The Diorama".

The Bow Gamelan Ensemble performed there in Summer 1985, reviewed in Performance Magazine. "Sparks fly at a recent performance at London's Diorama."

Billy Bragg, as part of the Red Wedge tour, played on the 11th January 1986. This was also a Diorama Benefit gig and had Skint Video and guests as performers.

Various Rave and Dance music events took place at the Diorama in 1989 and 1990 including (alphabetical): Arc, Crazy Feet, Karma, Menace, Project 679 and TomTom Club.

Towering Inferno made their album Kaddish using the Diorama in 1991. Quoting: "We knew we had to get a mythic, religious sound and we knew from playing there that the Diorama has a five or six second reverb."

The Manic Street Preachers played in December 1991. Quoting: "...the laddish music journalists trying to impress with Fabulous at the Diorama..."

The Pogues (quoting): " "You gotta see the Pogues" recalls Chevron. "They are the happening band in London at the moment." On 22 June, Elvis dutifully went along to the Diorama in Euston ..."

The London Musician's Collective was run from the Diorama at the end of the eighties. Quoting: "The organisation camped out in Simon's office in the Diorama, Regents Park, and contemplated its venue-less future. Events were organised at the Diorama, Red Rose, Air Gallery and Tom Allen Centre in Stratford, but a proper home proved hard to find."

Art

Various artists have exhibited at the Diorama. These include:

Rafael Klein exhibited four times as part of group shows. These were in 1989, 90, 91, 92.

Tai-Shan Schierenberg had two solo exhibitions, once in 1988 and then 1991.

In 1990 as part of a group show, Catherine Yass exhibited 'Madonnas'.

In 1990, Lucy Jones was part of a group exhibition named 'Out of Ourselves'.

In 1992 Phyllida Barlow curated a group exhibition 'Three Sculptures' which included the work 'Up Across Around'.

In 1992 Rob Ryan exhibited as one of the 'Artists against Clause 28'.

Drama, video and film

Graeae Theatre Company used the building as a rehearsal space from February 1980 prior to performances at, for example, The University of Guildford in May 1980 and a tour of America shortly thereafter. Quoting: "It was going to take two or three months to get the show together. Some of the cast members were working, with full time 9 to 5 jobs, 5 days a week. Secondly, one was a full time mother and thirdly we were from various parts of Britain."

Video and film makers include (alphabetical): Gaynor O'Flynn, Richard Layzell and Katharine Meynell. In 1982 Cosey Fanni Tutti recorded "Diorama - live action by Cosey at the Diorama."

Art in Danger took place in 1985 and 1986 with performers such as The Bow Gamelan Ensemble, Richard Layzell, Anne Seagrave and the Wild Wigglers.

The East London Theatre Archive has images of CAST New Variety at the Diorama flyers from 1984 onwards. Examples include:

Within the Bill Douglas Cinema Museum Collection is a number of items on the Diorama through the eighties and nineties: The following list contains 8 examples that are dated. Item number (i.n.)(chronological 1982 - 1992): (i.n.) 97944, (i.n.) 97945, (i.n.) 97934, (i.n.) 97939, (i.n.) 97947, (i.n.) 97949, (i.n.) 97928, (i.n.) 97933.

The London Disabilities Forum (LDF) hold their first AGM at the Diorama in April 1988 and in the same month a cabaret, later to become the Workhorse, was launched. LDF also put on a visual arts exhibition called "Out of Ourselves" in February 1990. In June 1990 Shape Arts held the "No Excuses Theatre Cabaret", performed by a Liverpool-based company of disabled actors.

Drama collective The Mombasa Roadshow performed in March 1989 "The White Devil" and in April 1990 "The Bacchae", courtesy of the Diorama Arts Club.

Other activities

By 1981, psychotherapists the Philadelphia Association (PA) had an office and later a consulting room in the Diorama, while Hilary Randall and Paul Zeal from the PA became Directors of the DACL. Quoting: "The PA is a network of people whose distinctive concern is to cultivate skillful means of helping people whose relations with themselves and others have become an occasion of wretchedness ..." Paul Zeal remembers PA being present as far back as 1976 or 1977 when they were running seminars with 'group process' groups.

Collusion magazine was based at the Diorama between 1982 and 1983, "Putting Music in its Place". The magazine was founded by Steve Beresford, Sue Steward and David Toop in 1981 and its musical content included experimental, global, popular and world. But however, the magazine only published 5 issues and ceased to exist in September 1983.

Performance magazine was based at the Diorama between 1982 - 87. Quoting: "Between 1979-1992 Performance Magazine documented an extraordinary period in the development of art in the UK. With its maverick and punk ethos Performance Magazine embodied an immensely active community of artists, writers and publics that crossed disciplines throughout the late 70s, 80s and the start of the 90s."

Fashion company Slag had a studio at the Diorama in the late eighties until its closure. Quoting: "They're 25ish, have no admitted names other than Andy (him) and Adie (her) - collectively Slag ... They perch in a workroom in a run-down peculiarity of a building - the Diorama - and their place looks like a carnival novelties store, or a backstage attic prior to final closure. But then, they belong to that generation which grew up in playspace cluttered with encouragements to creativity..."

Studio Upstairs had a studio at the Diorama from 1989. Quoting: "At Studio Upstairs, people with psychiatric problems have a place to express their interests and abilities through art." From the same article: "Behind its Regency facade, Diorama's interior hides a hive of activity including a cafe (The Octagon), Tai Chi classes, and musicians of all sorts."

Body painters the Neo Naturists gave a May Day performance at the Diorama, 1 May 1990.

References

External links 
Luminous Music
PlaySpace publications

Acting
Art and design organizations
Artist cooperatives
Art therapy
Creative arts therapies
Disability culture
Electronic dance music venues
History of the London Borough of Camden
Independent magazines
Musical culture
Musical theatre
Performing arts
Street fashion
Video art